Thumb Promontory is a prominent rock spur on the north side of Lackey Ridge, Ohio Range. Thumb Promontory was unofficially named by a New Zealand Antarctic Research Program (NZARP) field party to the Ohio Range, 1979–80. The name was formally proposed by geologist Margaret Bradshaw, member of a second NZARP field party, 1983–84. So named because of the similarity of the upper part of this feature to an upturned thumb from certain angles.

Ridges of Marie Byrd Land